The 507th Maintenance Company was a United States Army unit which was ambushed during the Battle of Nasiriyah in the rapid advance towards Baghdad during 2003 invasion of Iraq on 23 March 2003.  The most well known member of the unit was Private First Class Jessica Lynch whose rescue from an Iraqi hospital received worldwide media coverage.  Sergeant Donald Walters and Private First Class Patrick Miller were both awarded the Silver Star for valor.  Sergeant Matthew Rose was awarded the Bronze Star Medal with "V" Device.  Many other members of the unit were decorated as well, receiving the Bronze Star Medal, Purple Heart, and/or Prisoner of War Medal.

On 16 July 2005, the 507th Maintenance Company was redesignated as Battery E, 5th Battalion, 52d Air Defense Artillery Regiment.  In 2006, A monument to the 507th Maintenance Company was placed within the battalion's area on Fort Bliss, Texas. In January 2007, the unit's designation was changed to Battery F.

Overview
The 507th Maintenance Company provided maintenance support to 5th Battalion, 52nd Air Defense Artillery, a Patriot missile unit based at Fort Bliss, Texas.  Previously, it was assigned to 2d Battalion, 7th Air Defense Artillery, 11th Air Defense Artillery Brigade, another Patriot missile unit at Fort Bliss which played a major support role in the Persian Gulf War. During its Iraq deployment in 2003, the 507th was attached to 31st Air Defense Artillery Brigade.

History

2003: Iraq War

The Battle of Nasiriyah

A trail vehicle convoy element of this unit was ambushed during the rapid advance towards Baghdad during Operation Iraqi Freedom on 23 March 2003. The 507th was last in a march column of over 600 vehicles from the 3rd Infantry Division. This element which included the heavier, slower vehicles of the 507th, made a wrong turn into Nasiriyah, a major crossing point over the Euphrates River northwest of Basra.  A U.S. Army investigation concluded that this wrong turn was the result of a navigational error compounded by a lack of rest, limited communications and human error.

Killed in action
The following soldiers of the 507th Maintenance Company were killed in action:

Two soldiers from the 3rd Forward Support Battalion of the 3rd Infantry Division, Specialist Edward J. Anguiano, 24, of Brownsville, Texas, and Sergeant George Edward Buggs, 31, of Barnwell, South Carolina, were also killed in action with the 507th Maintenance Company after falling back in the column to assist the 507th with vehicle recovery.

Prisoners of war

The following soldiers of the 507th Maintenance Company were captured and held as prisoners of war (POWs):

Wounded in action
The following soldiers of the 507th Maintenance Company were wounded in action:

Escaped capture
The following soldiers of the 507th Maintenance Company were noted to have escaped capture by media accounts:

Notes

References
The Oregonian, Left Behind, 13 April 2003.
Texas Senate Resolution 50, recognizing 13 members of the 507th Maintenance Company

Maintenance 507
Military maintenance